Los Plebes del Rancho (in English, "The guys from the ranch"), are a Regional Mexican band, specializing in the Sierreño-Banda style. The group was founded in 2013 as Ariel Camacho y Los Plebes del Rancho, by Ariel Camacho and his friend César Sánchez and were originally signed to JG Entertainment. They signed with DEL Records in 2014, but then left in 2016 due to disputes with the owner. The death of Ariel Camacho caused changes to the group.

The group consists of a Twelve-string guitar, a Six-string acoustic guitar, and a Sousaphone tuba. This style of Regional Mexican music, a hybrid of Sinaloa-style Sierreño and Banda, is sometimes confused with Norteño.

Los Plebes del Rancho are credited with turning their style of music, which had previously been an obscure genre from the sierras (mountain ranges) of Northwestern Mexico, into a mainstream genre popular across Mexico and the Mexican-American community of the United States.

In 2015, Ariel Camacho died in a car accident.

However, a legal battle with their label, DEL Records, ensued as both the company and the band claimed to be the owners of the name "Los Plebes del Rancho". In the end, the band was split in two: José Manuel López Castro and César Sánchez left DEL Records and continued to record as "Los Plebes del Rancho", while their original sousaphone player, Omar Burgos, sided with DEL Records and was recruited to be part of a new sierreño-banda band promoted by the label: "Ulises Chaidez y sus Plebes". Therefore, Los Plebes del Rancho recruited Israel Meza as their new Tuba player.

Their songs "Por Enamorarme” (2016) and "Será Que Estoy Enamorado" (2017) have topped the Mexican airplay charts. The band’s vocalist and lead guitarist José Manuel Lopez Castro left in September 2018, being replaced by Johnny Cortés.

Discography

Studio albums

Notes

References

Mexican musical groups